1766 Slipher, provisional designation , is a Paduan asteroid from the central regions of the asteroid belt, approximately 18 kilometers in diameter. It was discovered on 7 September 1962, by astronomers of the Indiana Asteroid Program at Goethe Link Observatory in Indiana, United States. The asteroid was named after American astronomers Vesto Slipher and his brother Earl C. Slipher.

Classification and orbit 

Slipher is member of the mid-sized Padua family, an asteroid family named after 363 Padua and at least 25 million years old. It consists of mostly X-type asteroids, that were previously associated to 110 Lydia (the Padua family is therefore also known as Lydia family).

Slipher orbits the Sun in the central main-belt at a distance of 2.5–3.0 AU once every 4 years and 7 months (1,665 days). Its orbit has an eccentricity of 0.09 and an inclination of 5° with respect to the ecliptic.

Physical characteristics 

In the SMASS classification, Slipher is a carbonaceous C-type asteroid. PanSTARRS photometric survey characterized the asteroid as an X-type asteroid, which is in line with the overall spectral type of the Padua family.

Rotation period 

In 2012, two rotational lightcurves of Slipher were obtained from photometric observations by astronomers at the Palomar Transient Factory in California. Lightcurve analysis gave a rotation period of 7.677 and 7.693 hours with a brightness variation of 0.20 and 0.19 magnitude in the S- and R-band, respectively.

Diameter and albedo 

According to the surveys carried out by the Japanese Akari satellite and the NEOWISE mission of NASA's Wide-field Infrared Survey Explorer, Slipher measures between 14.37 and 20.29 kilometers in diameter and its surface has an albedo between 0.044 and 0.11.

The Collaborative Asteroid Lightcurve Link assumes a standard albedo for carbonaceous asteroids of 0.057 and calculates a diameter of 20.21 kilometers based on an absolute magnitude of 12.2.

Naming 

This minor planet was named after the brothers Vesto Slipher (1876–1969) and Earl C. Slipher (1883–1964), both graduates of Indiana University. Vesto Slipher was a pioneer investigator of the spectra of the planets, and was the first to measure the redshifts of galaxies, which was instrumental for Hubble's discovery of the expanding Universe. Earl Slipher developed and improved the direct photography of the planets. His photographs are the only continuous and systematic record of the appearance of the planets for a period of more than half a century.

The lunar and Martian Slipher craters were also named after the two brothers. The official  was published by the Minor Planet Center on 20 February 1971.

References

External links 
 Asteroid Lightcurve Database (LCDB), query form (info )
 Dictionary of Minor Planet Names, Google books
 Asteroids and comets rotation curves, CdR – Observatoire de Genève, Raoul Behrend
 Discovery Circumstances: Numbered Minor Planets (1)-(5000) – Minor Planet Center
 
 

001766
001766
Named minor planets
001766
19620907